"Run Baby Run" is a song performed by French singer Amanda Lear from her second album Sweet Revenge, released as a single in 1978 by Ariola Records.

Song information 
"Run Baby Run" is an uptempo disco song with pop rock elements, composed by Anthony Monn, with lyrics written by Amanda Lear herself. The song arrangement is credited to producers Charly Ricanek and Rainer Pietsch, with whom Lear and Monn frequently collaborated during the disco era. The track is part of the song suite from the Sweet Revenge album, which tells a story of a girl tempted by the Devil.

The song was released as the single in selected territories. Although the front cover of the 7" European single indicated "Follow Me" as the lead song, it was actually released on side B. In South Africa, the B-side was "The Stud", another pop rock track taken from Sweet Revenge. "Run Baby Run" was promoted by TV performances, but failed to chart.

Music video 
The music video for the song was produced as part of Italian TV show Stryx. It pictures Lear dancing in a leopard print dress with other Stryx characters rolling and sliding on the floor behind her. The video was directed by Enzo Trapani and first aired in autumn 1978.

Track listing 

Portuguese 7" single
A. "Run Baby Run" – 2:58
B. "Follow Me" – 3:55

Belgian 7" single
A. "Run Baby Run" – 2:58
B. "Follow Me" (Part Two) – 3:40

South African 7" single
A. "Run Baby Run" – 3:45
B. "The Stud" – 4:02

12" single
A. "Run Baby Run" – 3:40
B. "Follow Me (Reprise)" – 3:40

Cover versions
 In 2006, Spanish singer Pedro Marín covered the song on his Amanda Lear tribute album Diamonds.

References 

1978 singles
1978 songs
Amanda Lear songs
Ariola Records singles
Songs written by Amanda Lear
Songs written by Anthony Monn